Duguetia lepidota is a tree in the plant family Annonaceae, endemic to the region between Brazil, Venezuela, and Colombia.

Description 
Duguetia lepidota is a fruiting tree which grows to a height of 10 to 20 m and a diameter of 15 to 70 cm. The fruit which is green when young slowly ripens into a pinkish-yellow exterior with a vibrant orange interior. The exterior of the fruit is unlike any of the other Duguetia species with mushroom-like areoles attached to the skin of the fruit, fused for 65% to 75% of the surface.

References

Annonaceae
Flora of South America